Sammilani Mahavidyalaya, established in 1996, is an undergraduate and postgraduate college in Kolkata, West Bengal, India. It is affiliated with the University of Calcutta.

Departments

Science
Chemistry
Physics
Mathematics
Computer Science
Molecular Biology
Zoology
Microbiology
Geography

Arts and Commerce
Education
Bengali
English
Sanskrit
History
Political Science
Philosophy
Commerce

Library
The library caters to its students and scholarly community six days a week except Sunday. It has a growing collection of over 17000 books on different subjects. The library also subscribes to a few print journals and popular magazines. Every year it selects and awards one student as the best user in order to encourage the reading habits of the students. The library also subscribed to INFLIBNET's N-List for e-resources meant for colleges. The library used Koha ILS to automate its operations, it has also hosted its OPAC online for 24x7x365 access. In keeping with the demands of the time, the library provides its readers with Wi-Fi facility for Internet.

The Library OPAC (Online public access catalog) is accessible at http://sammilanimahavidyalaya-opac.l2c2.co.in

Accreditation
Sammilani Mahavidyalaya is recognized by the University Grants Commission (UGC).

See also 
List of colleges affiliated to the University of Calcutta
Education in India
Education in West Bengal

References

External links
Sammilani Mahavidyalaya

Educational institutions established in 1996
University of Calcutta affiliates
Universities and colleges in Kolkata
1996 establishments in West Bengal